The 2004–05 Edmonton Oilers season was the Oilers' 26th season in the NHL, however, the 2004–05 NHL lockout, which began a day after the 2004 World Cup of Hockey, cancelled the playing of any games.

Edmonton Roadrunners

With the NHL season wiped out, the Oilers would move their AHL team, the Toronto Roadrunners, to Edmonton, rename the club the Edmonton Roadrunners, and they played out of Rexall Place.  The Roadrunners would finish with the 3rd highest attendance figure in the league, averaging 8854 fans per game.

Schedule
The Oilers regular season schedule was announced on July 14, 2004.

|-
| 1 || September 24 || Vancouver Canucks

|-
| 2 || September 28 || @ Calgary Flames
|-
| 3 || October 1 || Calgary Flames
|-
| 4 || October 3 || Calgary Flames
|-
| 5 || October 5 || @ Vancouver Canucks
|-
| 6 || October 7 || @ Calgary Flames
|-

|-
| 1 || October 14 || Detroit Red Wings
|-
| 2 || October 17 || Calgary Flames
|-
| 3 || October 19 || @ Minnesota Wild
|-
| 4 || October 21 || Minnesota Wild
|-
| 5 || October 23 || St. Louis Blues
|-
| 6 || October 26 || Columbus Blue Jackets
|-
| 7 || October 29 || @ Dallas Stars
|-
| 8 || October 30 || @ Minnesota Wild
|-
| 9 || November 2 || @ Detroit Red Wings
|-
| 10 || November 4 || Nashville Predators
|-
| 11 || November 6 || @ Calgary Flames
|-
| 12 || November 9 || @ Columbus Blue Jackets
|-
| 13 || November 11 || @ Pittsburgh Penguins
|-
| 14 || November 12 || @ Buffalo Sabres
|-
| 15 || November 14 || @ Chicago Blackhawks
|-
| 16 || November 16 || @ Colorado Avalanche
|-
| 17 || November 18 || Chicago Blackhawks
|-
| 18 || November 20 || Minnesota Wild
|-
| 19 || November 22 || Nashville Predators
|-
| 20 || November 24 || @ Minnesota Wild
|-
| 21 || November 25 || @ Nashville Predators
|-
| 22 || November 27 || Colorado Avalanche
|-
| 23 || December 2 || Toronto Maple Leafs
|-
| 24 || December 5 || Columbus Blue Jackets
|-
| 25 || December 7 || @ Calgary Flames
|-
| 26 || December 9 || @ San Jose Sharks
|-
| 27 || December 11 || @ Los Angeles Kings
|-
| 28 || December 12 || @ Anaheim Mighty Ducks
|-
| 29 || December 14 || Calgary Flames
|-
| 30 || December 18 || @ Vancouver Canucks
|-
| 31 || December 21 || @ Calgary Flames
|-
| 32 || December 23 || Los Angeles Kings
|-
| 33 || December 26 || Vancouver Canucks
|-
| 34 || December 28 || Minnesota Wild
|-
| 35 || December 30 || Philadelphia Flyers
|-
| 36 || January 1 || Montreal Canadiens
|-
| 37 || January 2 || San Jose Sharks
|-
| 38 || January 4 || @ Colorado Avalanche
|-
| 39 || January 6 || @ St. Louis Blues
|-
| 40 || January 8 || @ Phoenix Coyotes
|-
| 41 || January 11 || San Jose Sharks
|-
| 42 || January 13 || Dallas Stars
|-
| 43 || January 15 || Ottawa Senators
|-
| 44 || January 17 || @ San Jose Sharks
|-
| 45 || January 18 || @ Los Angeles Kings
|-
| 46 || January 20 || New York Islanders
|-
| 47 || January 22 || Vancouver Canucks
|-
| 48 || January 24 || Anaheim Mighty Ducks
|-
| 49 || January 27 || @ Vancouver Canucks
|-
| 50 || January 28 || New Jersey Devils
|-
| 51 || February 1 || Colorado Avalanche
|-
| 52 || February 3 || Detroit Red Wings
|-
| 53 || February 5 || New York Rangers
|-
| 54 || February 7 || Calgary Flames
|-
| 55 || February 9 || Phoenix Coyotes
|-
| 56 || February 15 || @ Columbus Blue Jackets
|-
| 57 || February 17 || @ Montreal Canadiens
|-
| 58 || February 19 || @ Toronto Maple Leafs
|-
| 59 || February 21 || @ Ottawa Senators
|-
| 60 || February 23 || @ Chicago Blackhawks
|-
| 61 || February 25 || Boston Bruins
|-
| 62 || February 27 || Phoenix Coyotes
|-
| 63 || March 1 || @ Detroit Red Wings
|-
| 64 || March 3 || @ St. Louis Blues
|-
| 65 || March 6 || @ Nashville Predators
|-
| 66 || March 7 || @ Carolina Hurricanes
|-
| 67 || March 9 || @ Florida Panthers
|-
| 68 || March 11 || @ Tampa Bay Lightning
|-
| 69 || March 13 || @ Atlanta Thrashers
|-
| 70 || March 15 || St. Louis Blues
|-
| 71 || March 17 || @ Colorado Avalanche
|-
| 72 || March 18 || @ Dallas Stars
|-
| 73 || March 21 || Colorado Avalanche
|-
| 74 || March 23 || @ Anaheim Mighty Ducks
|-
| 75 || March 24 || @ Phoenix Coyotes
|-
| 76 || March 26 || Washington Capitals
|-
| 77 || March 29 || Chicago Blackhawks
|-
| 78 || April 1 || Dallas Stars
|-
| 79 || April 3 || Anaheim Mighty Ducks
|-
| 80 || April 5 || Los Angeles Kings
|-
| 81 || April 7 || @ Vancouver Canucks
|-
| 82 || April 9 || Vancouver Canucks
|-

Transactions
The Oilers were involved in the following transactions from June 8, 2004, the day after the deciding game of the 2004 Stanley Cup Finals, through February 16, 2005, the day the  season was officially cancelled.

Trades

Players acquired

Players lost

Signings

Draft picks
Edmonton's draft picks at the 2004 NHL Entry Draft, which was held at the RBC Center in Raleigh, North Carolina on June 26–27, 2004.

Notes

References
SHRP Sports
The Internet Hockey Database
National Hockey League Guide & Record Book 2007

Edmonton Oilers season, 2004-05
Edmon
Edmonton Oilers seasons